Palaces and Parks of Potsdam and Berlin are a group of palace complexes and extended landscape gardens located in the Havelland region around Potsdam and the German capital of Berlin. The term was used upon the designation of the cultural ensemble as a World Heritage Site by UNESCO in 1990. It was recognized for the historic unity of its landscape—a unique example of landscape design against the background of monarchic ideas of the Prussian state and common efforts of emancipation.

Extent
Initially, the world heritage site encompassed 500 hectares, covering 150 construction projects, which spanned the years from 1730 to 1916. Until the Peaceful Revolution of 1989, these areas were separated by the Berlin Wall, running between Potsdam and West Berlin, and several historic sites were destructed by 'death strip' border fortifications.

Two stages of extension to the World Heritage Site, in 1992, and 1999 led to the incorporation of a larger area. The Prussian Palaces and Gardens Foundation Berlin-Brandenburg, which administers the site, puts the area at 2,064 hectares.

1990 designation

 Palace and Park of Sanssouci, Potsdam
 Neuer Garten (New Garden), Marmorpalais (Marble Palace), and Schloss Cecilienhof, northeast of Sanssouci, Potsdam
 Park Babelsberg and Schloss Babelsberg, Potsdam 
 Schloss Glienicke and Park Klein-Glienicke, Berlin
 Nikolskoe log house, Berlin
 Pfaueninsel (Peacock Island), Berlin
 Böttcherberg (Mount Böttcher), Berlin
 Jagdschloß Glienicke (Glienicke hunting lodge), Berlin

1992 extension
 Heilandskirche (Church of the Redeemer), Sacrow (Potsdam)
 Palace and Park of Sacrow, Potsdam

1999 extension
 Lindenallee, Potsdam
 Königliche Gärtnerlehranstalt (former gardeners' school) and the Kaiserbahnhof, Potsdam
 Palace and Park of Lindstedt, Potsdam 
 Village of Bornstedt, church, cemetery and landscape north of Park Sanssouci, Potsdam 
 The Seekoppel (landscape area west of Ruinenberg (Mount of Ruins)), Potsdam 
 Voltaireweg (greenbelt and road between Park Sanssouci and Neuer Garten), Potsdam 
 Entrance area of Park Sanssouci, Potsdam
 Alexandrowka log houses ("Russian colony"), Potsdam
 The Pfingstberg and Belvedere auf dem Pfingstberg, Potsdam 
 An area between Pfingstberg and Neuer Garten, Potsdam 
 Southern shore of the Jungfernsee, Potsdam 
 Königswald (King's Forest, forests surrounding Palace and Park of Sacrow), Potsdam
 Approaches to Babelsberg Park, Potsdam 
 Observatory in Babelsberg, Potsdam

See also
List of castles in Berlin and Brandenburg
List of sights of Potsdam

References

External links

 Palaces and Parks of Potsdam and Berlin  UNESCO Official Website

Prussian Palaces and Gardens Foundation

Landmarks in Germany
Palaces in Brandenburg
World Heritage Sites in Germany
Tourist attractions in Brandenburg
Tourist attractions in Potsdam
Brandenburg-related lists
Berlin-related lists